Matroni and Me is a Canadian comedy film, directed by Jean-Philippe Duval and released in 1999.

Based on a theatrical play by Alexis Martin, the film stars Martin as Gilles, an academic who meets Guylaine (Guylaine Tremblay) while on vacation in Ogunquit. However, when he tries to connect with her after they return home to Montreal, her brother Bob (Gary Boudreault) draws him into the orbit of Matroni (Pierre Lebeau), a local Mafia boss. The film's cast also includes Maude Guérin, Pierre Curzi, Alex Ivanovici, Pierre Harel and Tony Conte.

Awards
The film received two Genie Award nominations at the 20th Genie Awards, for Best Adapted Screenplay (Duval, Martin) and Best Editing (Alain Baril), and seven Jutra Award nominations at the 2nd Jutra Awards, for Best Director (Duval), Best Actor (Lebeau), Best Actress (Tremblay), Best Supporting Actor (Boudreault), Best Supporting Actress (Guérin), Best Screenplay (Duval, Martin) and Best Cinematography (André Turpin).

References

External links

1999 films
Canadian crime comedy films
Quebec films
Films based on Canadian plays
Films directed by Jean-Philippe Duval
French-language Canadian films
1990s Canadian films